The Telia Grand Opening was a golf tournament played as the season opening event between 1999 and 2005 on the Swedish Golf Tour, at the time known as the Telia Tour. 

The tournament was played in conjunction with the women's Telia Grand Opening.

Winners

Notes

References

Swedish Golf Tour events
Golf tournaments in Sweden
1999 establishments in Sweden
2005 disestablishments in Sweden